Marc Polmans was the defending champion but lost in the second round to Tristan Lamasine.

Lloyd Harris won the title after defeating Lorenzo Giustino 6–2, 6–2 in the final.

Seeds
All seeds receive a bye into the second round.

Draw

Finals

Top half

Section 1

Section 2

Bottom half

Section 3

Section 4

References
Main draw
Qualifying draw

2019 ATP Challenger Tour